FC Ararat (Ârarat Tehran) is an Armenian diaspora football team based in Tehran, Iran who play in the Tehran Province League. Ararat football club is the football club of the multisport Ararat Club in Iran.

Ararat has a policy of signing only players who have an Armenian heritage.

Club history

Establishment
The club was established in 1944 by a group of Armenian-Iranians. They named the club after the famous mountain of the same name. The club was run by an Armenian athletic organization and was one of few clubs in Iranian football to have its own private stadium and training facilities. The club has never had spectacular results, but has always provided talented players for Iranian football. It was heavily supported by the Armenian minority in Iran, but was also loved by many non-Armenian Iranians.

Drop to the lower leagues
The last time the club played in the top level of Iranian football was the 1995–96 season of the Azadegan League (current IPL). Due to the poor decisions of the club management, Ararat FC has spent most of the past few years playing in the 1st Division and 2nd Division of Iran's football leagues. Until recently the club had a policy of only employing Armenian staff and players, but with the team's poor form in the past few years, this decision has been overturned and non-Armenians have coached the team. The players though are all Armenian-Iranians. In the 2005–06 season the club came very close to promotion into the Azadegan League, but fell short in the last few weeks of the season.

In 2007–08 season they took the last place in their group and relegated to 3rd division but in July 2008, Iran Football Federation increased number of 2nd Division teams to 28 and Ararat still remained in 2nd Division.

A major changes heralded for Ararat in 2008, as the terrible state of the club's finances was revealed, they were unable to pay wages and had major debts. The club's owner, Armenian-Iranians, were able to raise some more money, but even this soon proved to be insufficient resources to sustain the club. They finished last in the 2nd Division (group A) standings of the 2008–09 season. Thus, being relegated to 3rd Division. After the club's relegation, Arrarat was dissolved by its owners.

Refounding
Arrarat was reopened on 9 October 2014 after a five years of absence. They also played a friendly match at the same day with Esteghlal XI. The club was placed in the Tehran Provincial League Division 1 and lost their first match 2–1. In 2015 the club was promoted to the Tehran Provincial League.

Season-by-season

The table below chronicles the achievements of Ararat in various competitions since 1965.

Key

P = Played
W = Games won
D = Games drawn
L = Games lost
F = Goals for
A = Goals against
Pts = Points
Pos = Final position

TJC = Takht Jamshid Cup
TFL = Tehran Football League
SEC = Shahid Espandi Cup
TFL2 = Tehran Football League's 2nd Div.
Div 1 = Azadegan League
Div 2 = 2nd Division
Div 3 = 3rd Division
TPL = Tehran Province league
TPL.Div 1 = Tehran Province league's 1st Div.

Current Management Team

Head coaches

 Garnik Mehrabian (1963–1973)
 Mansour Amirasefi (c.1980s)
 Hassan Habibi (c.1980s)
 Mehdi Dinvarzade (c.2015s)

References

External links

Official
  Official sports section of the Ararat Armenian Cultural Organization of Iran

Fan site
  Ararat FC Fan Blog

official instagram
  blog

Association football clubs established in 1944
Football clubs in Tehran
1944 establishments in Iran
Armenian association football clubs outside Armenia